State Route 149 (SR 149) is an L-shaped state highway in eastern Ohio. Though the east–west leg of the route is longer than the north–south portion, the entire route is signed as north–south. The route starts at an interchange with SR 7 in Bellaire. The route heads west to Belmont where it turns north at an intersection with SR 147. After spending most of the time in Belmont County, SR 149's northern terminus is at SR 9 near New Athens, Harrison County.

Route description
SR 149 begins at an interchange with SR 7 in Bellaire, just west of the Ohio River. The route heads west on 26th Street through Bellaire paralleling the McMahon Creek. Shortly after leaving Bellaire, the route passes through a large Cut as the creek bends to the south briefly. As the route heads west along the creek, SR 149 passes through several unincorporated communities including Neffs and Glencoe. In Warnock, SR 149 meets and shares a short concurrency (signed as a wrong-way concurrency) with SR 9. Continuing west, the route enters Belmont as Main Street and reaches SR 147 at Jefferson Street. The two routes continue west on Main Street, make a left turn onto Bridge Street, and make a right turn at Railroad Street before exiting the village. At an intersection just west of the village, SR 147 and SR 149 end their concurrency; SR 147 continues west towards Bethesda while SR 149 heads north from this point.

Prior to here, SR 149 traveled through a densely wooded valley, but now the route heads through more farmland with rolling terrain. As the route approaches Morristown, the route meets I-70 at Exit 208. From the interchange until the intersection with US 40, the route is surrounded by small businesses, fast foot restaurants, and the campuses of Union Local High School and Union Local Middle School. SR 149 shares a brief  concurrency with US 40 on the edge of Morristown. After the westernmost intersection with US 40, SR 149 continues north again towards Flushing. In Flushing, SR 149 heads north on Morristown Street until it reaches SR 331 at High Street. The two routes head east on High Street through downtown Flushing and exit the village together. East of Flushing, SR 149 heads northeast for the last  of the route through Belmont County. Upon entering Harrison County, SR 149 continues northeast until ending at an intersection with SR 9 just south of the New Athens village limits.

No part of SR 149 is included within the National Highway System. The route is lightly traveled; the busiest section of the road as measured by the Ohio Department of Transportation (ODOT) is within the SR 7 interchange in Bellaire with an AADT of 9,560.

History
The highway now known as SR 149 between Morristown and New Athens has been a part of the State Highway System since 1912; the route was called SR 103 until 1922.
 By 1923, the Morristown-New Athens route was renumbered to SR 149. In 1930, the route was extended south to SR 147 just outside Belmont. In 1979, the route was extended from Belmont to Bellaire on essentially the route it runs today.

From 1979 to 2010, SR 149 traveled on a less-direct route through Bellaire. At the intersection of 26th Street and Belmont Street, SR 149 headed into downtown Bellaire and traveled on Belmont, Crescent, Guernsey, 32nd, and Hamilton Streets. In 2010, ODOT completed a  relocation of SR 149 to move the state highway off of the local streets in Bellaire.

Major junctions

References

External links

Ohio Department of Transportation Straight Line Diagrams – SR 149: Belmont County, Harrison County

149
Transportation in Belmont County, Ohio
Transportation in Harrison County, Ohio